Seonginbong (성인봉) is a mountain located on the South Korean island of Ulleungdo, in North Gyeongsang Province, off the eastern coast of the mainland Korean Peninsula. It is the tallest mountain on the island and has an elevation of 984 metres.

See also
List of mountains of Korea

References

Mountains of South Korea
Mountains of North Gyeongsang Province